Oscar Clarence Christianson (April 2, 1899May 19, 1972) was an American football player.  He played four seasons in the National Football League (NFL) as an end for the Minneapolis Marines from 1921 to 1924. He was selected as a third-team end on the 1924 All-Pro Team.

References

1899 births
1972 deaths
People from Elbow Lake, Minnesota
Players of American football from Minnesota
American football ends
Minneapolis Marines players